The Great Kidnapping (also known as The Police Look On and Ransom! Police Is Watching) is a 1973 Italian poliziottesco film directed by Roberto Infascelli.

Cast 
 Enrico Maria Salerno: Quaestor Cardone
 Lee J. Cobb: Ex Quaestor Iovine
 Jean Sorel:  Attorney
 Luciana Paluzzi: Renata Boletti
 Gianni Bonagura: Zenoni
 Laura Belli: Laura Ponti 
 Tino Bianchi: coroner
 Claudio Gora:  lawyer
 Ennio Balbo: Prefect

References

External links

1973 films
Poliziotteschi films
1973 crime films
Films scored by Stelvio Cipriani
1970s Italian films